Coimbatore North may refer to:
 Coimbatore North (state assembly constituency)
 Coimbatore-North taluk
 Coimbatore North Junction railway station

See also
 North coimbatore flyover